Elton is a rural municipality in the Canadian province of Manitoba, located to the north of the city of Brandon.  The community was incorporated in 1883, and its first officials took office the following year.

Its population in 2001 was 1,321.

Communities
 Douglas
 Forrest
 Justice

Demographics 

External links
Community Profile: Elton, Manitoba (Manitoba Community Files)
Map of Elton R.M. at Statcan

References

  Manitoba Historical Society - Manitoba Municipalities: Rural Municipality of Elton

Elton